is a Japanese H-game for Windows, developed and published by Groover. The game features a story that is centered on comedy and some suggestive situations. As such, the game falls under the Adventure Novel genre.

This game has been adapted into an anime television series and an Original Video Animation. In addition, two sequels have followed it, along with two spin-off games released on PlayStation 2.

Green Green was originally released as two CD-ROMs on October 5, 2001 by Groover. Groover rereleased the game as a DVD with additional features on March 22, 2002.

The two PlayStation 2 spin-off games carried the subtitles of ~Kanenone Romantic~ and ~Kanenone Dynamic~. Both were released by WellMADE on April 24, 2003.

Story
Green Green takes place in Japan’s countryside, in a non-descript region with forests and an isolated boarding school known as Kanenone Gakuen (鐘ノ音学園, literally translated as Sound of Bell Academy). The academy boasts of an entirely male population, and prides itself of the tradition of men growing amongst other men without any external influences to disturb them.

The protagonist is named Yuusuke Takasaki, a second year student that is indifferent to the lonely, girl-deprived atmosphere that surrounds the school. His three friends, Tadatomo “Bacchiguu” Ijuuin, Hikaru Ichibanboshi and Taizou Tenjin, however, feel as if they are being denied their youth by having no females to interact with. As the summer session at Kanenone begins, Yuusuke and friends wonder what the change of season will bring to them, when Bacchiguu brings news that a bus full of girls has arrived on school grounds.

As luck would have it, Kanenone's current administration is considering making the academy co-ed, and in order to see how the change would affect the student body, first and second year girls have been brought to live on school grounds for one month. Though Yuusuke takes the change in stride, his three hormone-driven friends see this as the true beginning of their youth.

Characters

The main character. The player takes the role of Yuusuke, making choices for him throughout the course of the game. Despite being rather ordinary, Yuusuke seems to be the one who always takes the blame for the antics of his friends. In fact, at the beginning of the game, Yuusuke is writing an essay that was assigned to him as punishment for using fireworks on school grounds. The actual culprits were Bacchiguu, Tenjin and Ichibanboshi.

One of the many girls that arrive at Kanenone Gakuen. Though Yuusuke knows nothing about her, Midori hints throughout the game that she knows a lot about him. Unlike most of the other girls, Midori does her best to try to get boys and girls to get along, and finds the antics of Bacchiguu, Tenjin and Ichibanboshi to be amusing. Despite her simple personality and cheerful disposition, Midori is very intelligent and understands more than she lets on. Strangely enough, she encourages the young Ko-Midori to room with Yuusuke.

The tomboyish man-hater. Futaba is brought to Kanenone against her will, and does everything she can to cause trouble. This includes talking back to teachers and giving all males the cold shoulder. Because of her strong personality, other girls tend to see Futaba as their leader. She has no tolerance for perversion, which makes her the natural enemy of Bacchiguu, Tenjin and Ichibanboshi. Starts out as the love interest of Ichibanboshi.

Younger sister of Futaba. Unlike her older sister, Wakaba tries to make the best of her stay at Kanenone Gakuen. Some think of her as peculiar because of the cactus she always carries around but in reality Wakaba is very simple-minded, and can pass off as gullible at times. She doesn't have the modesty that is characteristic of girls in anime and games, and does as she's told without protest. She has a strong appreciation for plants that can bloom flowers.

A quiet, sick girl. Sanae keeps her distance from others, and doesn’t make much of an effort to interact with her fellow students. She originally claims that her pill case carries only vitamins, but in reality it is medication for an illness she has. Physically, she is weak and looks younger than the other girls. This makes her the initial love interest of Tenjin, who has a younger sister complex.

The school nurse and science teacher. Chigusa arrives with the girls, and is solely responsible for keeping an eye on them during the one-month trial. Because she looks young, Yuusuke confuses her for a third year student and tries to nanpa her. From then on, she purposely calls Yuusuke “nanpa-kun” in public as a way of getting back at him. Despite being the adult, Chigusa is very easygoing, and takes on a rather active role in trying to get the boys and girls to get along. Her impressive proportions have earned her the admiration of several boys, most notably Bacchiguu.

The ugly girl. Initially dislikes the perverted ways of the boys, and does what she can to stay away from them. Arisa is one of the many girls that consider Futaba to be their leader, though ends up falling in love with Bacchiguu after he accidentally professes his feelings for her.

Leader of the quartet that includes Ichibanboshi, Tenjin and Yuusuke. Though he is a pervert, his intentions are not bad, so long as sex isn’t involved. Tends to rush into things without thinking, and is quick to let Yuusuke take the blame for his antics. Originally infatuated with Chigusa, but later starts dating Arisa Haruno.

The yes man of the group. Ichibanboshi mostly follows whatever the group does, though has his own ideas on how to win the girls over. Is a bit more down to earth than Bacchiguu, but not by much. His weak character lures him to Futaba Kutsuki. On the side, he’s a rock & roll guitarist with a band of his own.

The big, dumb country boy. Despite his size, Tenjin is rather simple in his way of doing things. He is Yuusuke’s roommate, and holds him in high regard. Tends to go along with whatever Bacchiguu plans, and is the muscle of the group. Has a fetish for really young girls (known as a younger sister complex), so he is naturally drawn to Sanae.

A little girl that mysteriously appears on school grounds, high atop the large tree that overlooks the school, which the students call Kanenone-sensei. She appears before Midori and Yuusuke, crying and confused about being away from home. Though Yuusuke is worried about finding the girl’s parents, Midori pushes the option of letting her stay in his room until she can find a way home. Yuusuke in turn allows her to stay, and names her Ko-Midori because her favorite color is green. The "Ko-" in her name is Yuusuke's way of differentiating between her and Midori Chitose.

Gameplay

General
The game takes place over the period of one month, from June 23 to the end of July (the exact date varies depending on which ending the player aims for). As such, game progression is daily, in which there are preset interactions in the early morning and late at night, with a block of time in the middle of the day that grants Yuusuke the opportunity to directly interact with one of the five lead heroines.

Some pre-set interactions are influenced by which girl Yuusuke last talked to and what choices the player made for him recently.

Should Yuusuke fail to win the heart of one of the five heroines by the end of July, the player is defaulted to a "common" ending.

Because Green Green falls into the novel genre of H-games, the player cannot change the protagonist's name, and instead assumes the role of Yuusuke.

Game engine
The game engine uses common elements found in dating simulation games, and as such is viewed in first person. Backgrounds are used to display the current location, with images of characters in Yuusuke's line of sight appearing on the screen. Characters that are not speaking will blink their eyes, and those that are speaking will move their lips accordingly. The current day is displayed on the upper left-hand corner of the screen.

A panel at the bottom of the screen is used to display text. At the sides of the panel are shortcut buttons to Load and Save games, toggle the current day display, access the game's Configuration menu, skip already-seen dialogue and have the game run on automatic.

Unlike most visual novel games, Green Green does not have a text log for dialogue.

Music

Though the "common" ending uses the game's theme song, Green Green, each heroine has a song that is used during the closing credits:

Midori Chitose: 
Futaba Kutsuki: 
Wakaba Kutsuki: 
Sanae Minami: 
Chigusa Iino:

Releases

CD-ROM
The original CD-ROM release of Green Green contained the game and few bonus features.

Scene replay mode
Music replay mode

DVD
The DVD rerelease of Green Green contained features not available in the original CD-ROM release. Most of these features are accessible by browsing the DVD. These included:

Event Artwork Gallery
Publicity Artwork Gallery
Artwork Slideshows
Trailers for Green Green

PlayStation 2
The two PlayStation 2 releases of Green Green were direct ports from the original CD-ROM version of the game. However, both Kanenone Romantic and Kanenone Dynamic featured two new female characters each in addition to the original five. As such, there were a total of four new girls exclusive to the PlayStation 2, each with their own closing song and ending:

In addition, new artwork, new closing songs for the original five girls and a built-in CG gallery were included. Because these were released on a video game console, all H-scenes were removed.

Staff
 Character Designs - 
 Scenario - , 
 Music - 
 Character Voices:
 (Midori Chitose, Ko-Midori)
 (Futaba Kutsuki)
 (Wakaba Kutsuki)
 (Sanae Minami)
 (Chigusa Iino)
 (Arisa Haruno)
 (Bacchiguu)
 (Ichibanboshi)
 (Taizou Tenjin)

Adaptations

Anime

Green Green was adapted into a 13-episode anime series.

Light novels
The game was adapted into four light novels.

Connected games

Additional notes
Bamboo became Bacchiguu, and Ichibanboshi Hikaru became a character name. Bamboo is also listed as Green Greens producer.

Character Names: The five lead girls are named after plants or things connected to plants. Midori means "green", Kutsuki Futaba means "twin leaves on a decayed tree", Kutsuki Wakaba means "new leaves on a decayed tree", Minami Sanae means "southern rice seedlings" and Iino Chigusa means "field of a thousand seeds".

Kutsuki vs. Kuchiki: The pronunciation of Futaba and Wakaba's last name has been the subject of debate since the release of the game. The game itself seems to have trouble deciding how to pronounce 朽木, often shifting between Kutsuki (くつき) and Kuchiki (くちき). Most of the voice actors stick to Kutsuki when talking about Futaba, while they use Kuchiki when talking about Wakaba.

Green Green case
During Green Greens beginning stages of development, the game was previously planned to be released on the summer of 2001 as a Frontwing creation and successor to their first game Canary (which was the team's first creation before Green Green). However, due to the breach of contract between Gungho Co., Ltd. and Frontwing, It was removed from Frontwing's planned lineup. A lack of communication between Frontwing and the Team was a major reason for the breach of contract between Gungho and Bamboo(Member of milktub.) By the end of April, Frontwing's representative Ryuichiro Yamakawa who is the representative and president of Frontwing, later emailed Bamboo the producer of the game, that Frontwing is gonna pull itself out of the "development consignment contract" between themselves and Gungho. Bamboo later relayed this information to Gungho and refunded Frontwing 540,000 yen. The Green Green official page which was showcased on Frontwing's official website and the official Canary website(before their official move) was later pulled off their products after Ryuichiro Yamakawa sent that email. After the development consignment contract concluded, Bamboo and Gungho still continued to create the game and were able to set up a deal with Sakamoto Co. Ltd for advertisement and also a company known as Starlink in which Gungho and Starlink created another brand known as GROOVER which Green Green was able to debut itself on. A year after Green Greens staggering success over Canary, Ryuichiro Yamakawa was aggravated and later filed a lawsuit against Sakamoto, Bamboo, and Gungho for copyright infringement. However, based on the information given, it was evident that Gungho and Bamboo were actually trying to help Frontwing by getting Green Green published under their brand, but due to some circumstances caused by Frontwing, the law sided with Gungho and Bamboo and found Ryuichiro Yamakawa's request to be unreasonable for action.

External links
 GROOVER  
 Green Green 3 Online Demo  
 WellMADE  
 Milktub 
 Game software "Green Green" case 
 Frontwing page of Green Green (Archived via Wayback Machine) 
 Canary.ac (Old Frontwing) Website Showing Green Green's Presence 

2001 video games
Bishōjo games
Eroge
Japan-exclusive video games
PlayStation 2 games
Visual novels
Windows games
Hentai anime and manga
Video games developed in Japan
Single-player video games